Izabela Burczyk (born 29 June 1972) is a Polish swimmer. She competed in the women's 200 metre backstroke event at the 1996 Summer Olympics.

References

External links
 

1972 births
Living people
Olympic swimmers of Poland
Swimmers at the 1996 Summer Olympics
People from Tczew
Polish female backstroke swimmers
20th-century Polish women
21st-century Polish women